Bristly foxtail is a common name for several grasses and may refer to:

Setaria barbata, native to tropical Africa and tropical Asia
''Setaria verticillata', native to Europe